Dakota City is a city in and the county seat of Humboldt County, Iowa, United States. The population was 759 at the time of the 2020 census. Dakota City shares its western border with the much larger city of Humboldt. It is the least populous county seat in Iowa.

History
Dakota City was laid out in 1855 and was named after the Dakota people. A post office was established as Dakotah in 1856, and renamed Dakota City in 1924.

Geography
Dakota City's longitude and latitude coordinates in decimal form are 42.721944, -94.200317.

Demographics

2010 census
As of the census of 2010, there were 843 people, 351 households, and 238 families residing in the city. The racial makeup of the city was 96.0% White, 0.1% African American, 0.5% Native American, 0.4% Asian, 1.4% from other races, and 1.7% from two or more races. Hispanic or Latino of any race were 4.2% of the population.

There were 351 households, of which 32.2% had children under the age of 18 living with them, 56.4% were married couples living together, 6.6% had a female householder with no husband present, 4.8% had a male householder with no wife present, and 32.2% were non-families. 25.6% of all households were made up of individuals, and 11.7% had someone living alone who was 65 years of age or older. The average household size was 2.40 and the average family size was 2.89.

The median age in the city was 39.3 years. 23.7% of residents were under the age of 18; 8% were between the ages of 18 and 24; 26.3% were from 25 to 44; 27.7% were from 45 to 64; and 14.4% were 65 years of age or older. The gender makeup of the city was 51.0% male and 49.0% female.

2000 census
As of the census of 2000, there were 911 people, 356 households, and 253 families residing in the city. The racial makeup of the city was 99.01% White, 0.11% Native American, 0.11% Asian, 0.44% from other races, and 0.33% from two or more races. Hispanic or Latino of any race were 1.43% of the population.

There were 356 households, out of which 38.5% had children under the age of 18 living with them, 57.3% were married couples living together, 9.6% had a female householder with no husband present, and 28.9% were non-families. 25.0% of all households were made up of individuals, and 11.5% had someone living alone who was 65 years of age or older. The average household size was 2.56 and the average family size was 3.04.

In the city, the population was spread out, with 28.0% under the age of 18, 9.9% from 18 to 24, 31.0% from 25 to 44, 19.9% from 45 to 64, and 11.3% who were 65 years of age or older. The median age was 34 years. For every 100 females, there were 101.5 males. For every 100 females age 18 and over, there were 94.1 males.

The median household income was $33,977 and the median family income was $39,306. Males had a median income of $30,250 versus $23,229 for females. The per capita income for the city was $15,441. About 5.2% of families and 6.6% of the population were below the poverty line, including 6.3% of those under age 18 and 7.3% of those age 65 or over.

Education
The Humboldt Community School District operates public schools. The city is served by Mease Elementary (Dakota City), Taft Elementary School (Humboldt), Humboldt Middle School, and Humboldt High School.

Point of interest
The Three Rivers Bike Trail, built on an abandoned railroad grade, passes through town. One of its interesting features is a trestle just south of its highway 3 overpass where it crosses another abandoned railway — also converted to a trail.  The "Three Rivers" refers to the East and West Forks of the Des Moines River and to the Boone River, all of which it spans.

Notable person

 Harry Reasoner - CBS correspondent

See also

Corydon Brown House is listed on the National Register of Historic Places
Humboldt County Courthouse

References

External links

Three Rivers Trail
City-Data Comprehensive Statistical Data and more about Dakota City
Home Page | The City of Dakota City Iowa

Cities in Iowa
Cities in Humboldt County, Iowa
County seats in Iowa
1855 establishments in Iowa
Populated places established in 1855